"I'll Say It's True" is a song written by and originally recorded by Johnny Cash for his 25th anniversary album Silver (1979). The song features George Jones on backing vocals.

Released as a single in 1979 (Columbia 1-11103, with "Cocaine Blues" from the same album on the opposite side), "I'll Say It's True" reached number 42 on U.S. Billboard country chart.

Track listing

Charts

References

External links 
 "I'll Say It's True" on the Johnny Cash official website

Johnny Cash songs
1979 songs
1979 singles
Songs written by Johnny Cash
Columbia Records singles